No Warning may refer to:

 No Warning (band), a Canadian punk band
 No Warning (album), the band's debut album
 No Warning, a 1991 album by British musician Dave Wakeling
 "No Warning", a song by King Crimson from Three of a Perfect Pair
 No Warning!, the second-season title of Panic (TV series)

See also
 Without Warning (disambiguation)